Reed Catherine Kessler (born July 9, 1994) is a former American show jumping competitor previously  based in the Netherlands. At 18 years old, Kessler qualified for the 2012 London Olympics, becoming the youngest rider in Show Jumping history to ever compete at the Games. Kessler trained with her godparents Katie and Henri Prudent for seven years. In September 2013 she began training with Germany's Marcus Ehning and moved to his home base in Borken, Germany.
Kessler is also an Ambassador for JustWorld International, a charity supporting education and healthcare in developing countries.

Personal life 
Kessler's father is Murray Kessler, President of the United States Equestrian Federation and CEO of Lorillard Tobacco Company. She is currently a student at Columbia University getting her master's degree.

Horses
Kessler has eight competition horses:

Aspen, a 2005 Dutch Warmblood mare, owned by Kessler Show Stables
 KS Stakki, a 2005 Hanoverian mare, owned by Kessler Show Stables and Wendy Smith

 Soraya de L'Obstination, a 2002 chestnut Belgian Warmblood mare, owned by Kessler Show Stables

 Cos I Can, a 2003 bay Irish Sport Horse gelding, owned by Kessler Show Stables 

Tradition de la Roque, a 2008 Selle Francais mare, owned by Kessler Show Stables
Christy 3, a 2007 Westphalian mare, owned by Kessler Show Stables
Up des Chaines, a 2008 chestnut Selle Francais gelding, owned by Kessler Show Stables
Quincy 162, a 2008 Oldenburg mare, owned by Kessler Show Stables

Past rides include Charity 33, Ligist, Flight, Mika, Ice D'Ancoeur, Onisha, Wolf S, Pacha de Nantuel, and her Olympic mount, Cylana.

2013 results
Only 1st- to 5th-place results are shown.

References

External links

 Biography at Kessler Show Stables' website

Sportspeople from Lexington, Kentucky
1994 births
People from Armonk, New York
Living people
American show jumping riders
American female equestrians
Olympic equestrians of the United States
Equestrians at the 2012 Summer Olympics
21st-century American women
Columbia University School of General Studies alumni
School of International and Public Affairs, Columbia University alumni